William "Jimmy" Hartwig (born 5 October 1954) is a German former professional footballer who played as a defensive midfielder. He played for Kickers Offenbach, TSV 1860 Munich, Hamburger SV, 1. FC Köln and FC Homburg of the Bundesliga and for Austria Salzburg of Austria. The son of an African-American soldier and a German mother, Hartwig was one of the first players who is of African descent in German and Austrian football.

Hartwig won the European Cup in 1983 with Hamburger SV, and was three times German league champion in 1979, 1982 und 1983 and three times league runner-up with Hamburger SV. He also earned two caps for the West Germany national team, making him only the second non-white player (after Erwin Kostedde) to achieve this feat.

After his playing career, Hartwig worked as a coach at FC Augsburg in 1989 and FC Sachsen Leipzig in 1990. He entered the TV business, where he has been working ever since, whilst also appearing in the theatre as an actor.

Personal life

In his 1994 autobiography, Hartwig described his tough childhood in the city of Offenbach am Main where he was born. He recounted a childhood full of poverty and anti-black racism, with only his German mother as support; his biological African father from Senegal never took care of him.

Hartwig is married for the fourth time and has three children.

Despite his opposition against anti-black racism, he was criticized for possible racism against East Asians using the word "ching chong" in his commentary on WELT-TV for the 2022 FIFA World Cup. The WELT management company removed the video from YouTube and Hartwig posted an apology on his Instagram.

Singing
In 1980, the single Mama Calypso was released, with Sometimes on the reverse side, on the RCA label.

Honours
 European Cup: 1982–83, runner-up 1979–80
 UEFA Cup finalist: 1981–82, 1985–86
 Bundesliga: 1978–79, 1981–82, 1982–83, runner-up: 1979–80, 1980–81, 1983–84

Autobiography
 Jimmy Hartwig: "Ich möchte noch so viel tun …" Meine Kindheit, meine Karriere, meine Krankheit; Bergisch Gladbach 1994; 
 Jimmy Hartwig: "Ich bin ein Kämpfer geblieben" Meine Siege, meine Krisen, mein Leben, Berlin, Siebenhaar-Verlag 2010;

References

External links

 
 
 
 European Champions Cup/UEFA Champions League Winning Squads

1954 births
Living people
Sportspeople from Offenbach am Main
Footballers from Hesse
German footballers
West German expatriate footballers
Germany international footballers
Germany B international footballers
German football managers
1. FC Köln players
FC 08 Homburg players
German people of American descent
Hamburger SV players
TSV 1860 Munich players
Expatriate footballers in Austria
Kickers Offenbach players
FC Red Bull Salzburg players
Bundesliga players
2. Bundesliga players
FC Augsburg managers
Association football midfielders
Ich bin ein Star – Holt mich hier raus! participants
West German footballers
West German football managers
German people of African-American descent